Jerry Harold Speiser (born 12 August 1953) is an Australian musician. He is best known as the drummer and a founding member of 1980s pop/new wave group Men at Work, which had Australian, US and UK hits with their singles "Who Can It Be Now?" and "Down Under" and their albums Business as Usual and Cargo. He left the band in 1984 and was a member of other groups including FX, One World and Frost.

Biography 
In an early session, he played on Greg Sneddon's Mind Stroll album in 1974, Sneddon was also part of the initial Men at Work line-up. He was also a drummer in a local band called Numbers in 1978 and early 1979.

Following Men at Work's break-up in 1985, he briefly joined pop band FX (featuring keyboard player John McCubbery), and then Ross Hannaford's band One World as a guitarist. In 1986, he and former Men at Work producer and sound engineer Peter McIan had a short stint with American band The City, where he played the drums while McIan played keyboards and produced the album Foundation. After that, Speiser joined pop rockers Frost where he played the drums in the single "You and Me" from their album The Usual Suspects.

Speiser (Drums/vocals) and Ben Fitzgerald (Guitars/vocals) co-founded a guitar-driven style rock band Where's Claire? In 1990, they were joined by Andrew Midson (Bass/vocals) and Brenden Mason (Guitars/vocals) and released their first commercial album, Long Time Coming, in 2002.
He also formed his own low keyed rock band The Working Stiffs and had a single called "Who Can It Be Down Under?"  By 2012 Speiser was a drummer for an Australian band After Burner.

References

External links 
 http://www.dirtyrascal.com.au/
 Where's Claire? on MySpace
 Jerry's Cross Rocks' page
  Jerry's MySpace page
 Jerry's Band The Working Stiffs
 http://www.afterburnerband.com/index.html
 https://web.archive.org/web/20120402133459/http://www.elwoodrsl.com.au/afterburner.html

1953 births
Living people
Australian drummers
Australian new wave musicians
Australian rock drummers
Male drummers
Men at Work members